The Towner County Courthouse in Cando, North Dakota is a historic Queen Anne-style building that was built in 1898. It was listed on the National Register of Historic Places in 1985.

It is a four-story wheat-colored brick building upon a cut stone foundation.  Queen Anne elements of its design include its irregular plan and complex roofline, including a gable where a higher tower once rose.

Also on the grounds is an old schoolhouse, which has been moved to the property.

References

Courthouses on the National Register of Historic Places in North Dakota
County courthouses in North Dakota
Queen Anne architecture in North Dakota
Government buildings completed in 1898
National Register of Historic Places in Towner County, North Dakota
1898 establishments in North Dakota